Vedano Olona is a comune (municipality) in the Province of Varese in the Italian region Lombardy, located about  northwest of Milan and about  southeast of Varese.

Vedano Olona borders the following municipalities: Binago, Castiglione Olona, Lozza, Malnate, Varese, Venegono Superiore.

References

Cities and towns in Lombardy